Yves-Alexandre Tripković is a French writer, stage director and translator.

Biography
Yves-Alexandre Tripković was born in Paris to a Croatian father and Japanese mother. He spent his parts of his childhood living in Paris, Toronto, Tokyo and Zagreb.

After high school graduation in Zagreb, Croatia, Tripković moved back to Paris where he still resides. He hold Arts, Literature and Civilisation Master's degree in Slavistics (Etudes Slaves) at Sorbonne (University of Paris).

He is the creative director of the production/festival/publishing house THEATROOM (formerly Theatroom noctuabundi).

Bibliography
 Krizantema, Disput, Zagreb, 2008
 Pariz nema jutra, Durieux, Zagreb, 2007
 Hermesov poučak, Zigo/Katapult, Rijeka, 2006

Stage Director
 La Mort d'Ismaïl aga  , Ivan Mažuranić, Ambassade de la République de Croatie, Paris, 2016
 Marseille blues, Henrik Aeshna, Festival THEATROOM, Paris, 2012
 L'Exposition, Claudio Magris, Théâtre de la passerelle , Paris, 2012
 Closer, Patrick Marber, Festival à contre sens, Paris, 2010
 Tulipe ou la Protestation, Romain Gary, Théâtre de Nesle, Paris, 2009
 Creont's Antigone, Miro Gavran, Théâtre de Nesle, Paris, 2005

Assistant Director 
 Le Maître Bâtisseur Hayruddin II, Ljubica Ostojić, director Sava Andjelkovic, Sorbonne, Paris, 2016
 Tesla, Darko Lukić & Stevan Pešić, director Sava Andjelkovic, Sorbonne, Paris, 2015
 L'Europe nue, Milko Valent, director Sava Andjelkovic, Sorbonne, Paris, 2014

Translations
Huddersfield, Uglješa Šajtinac, Le Fantôme de la liberté, Paris 2018
 Tesla, Darko Lukić & Stevan Pešić, Sorbonne, Paris, 2015
 Nous les grands fêtards, d’après les chants populaires de Pannonie, Sorbonne, Paris, 2015
 Madame Hamlet, Alfi Kabiljo, THEATROOM, Paris, 2015
 Turska noć, Philippe Videlier, Durieux, Zagreb, 2010
 O Dendizmu & Georgeu Brummellu, Barbey d'Aurevilly, Modernist, Varaždin, 2009
 Tehnosmoza, Mathieu Terence, Tehnosmoza, Novela, Zagreb, 2009
 Constantin Craintdieu, Simo Mraović, Theatroom noctuabundi, Paris, 2008
 L'Europe nue, Milko Valent, Theatroom noctuabundi, Paris, 2007
 Badem – intimna priča, Nedžma, OceanMore, Zagreb, 2006 
 Comment tuer le président, Miro Gavran, Theatroom noctuabundi, 2006 
 Pohvala parazitu, Lucian, Pohvala parazitu, Jesenski i Turk, Zagreb, 2005 
 Adam et Eve, Miroslav Krleža, Most/The Bridge, Zagreb, 2003

Photography
Tripković created a serial of photography of people on streets of Tokyo and Paris.

Awards
 Marin Držić Award – Krizantema, Disput, Zagreb, 2008
 Slavić for the best first book – Hermesov poučak, Zigo/Katapult, Rijeka, 2006

References

1972 births
Writers from Paris
21st-century French non-fiction writers
Living people
University of Paris alumni
French male writers
French people of Croatian descent
French people of Japanese descent